Zbigniew Fil (born 17 March 1977, in Zamość) is a Polish singer and multi-instrumentalist.

He studied viola at the Academy of Music in Kraków and won the TVN program Droga do gwiazd.

Discography 
 1997 Nic nie boli, tak jak życie (Budka Suflera)
 2005 Definition of Bass (Wojciech Pilichowski)
 2009 Zaczarowane Miasto (Łosowski)

References

1977 births
Living people
20th-century Polish male singers
21st-century Polish male singers
21st-century Polish singers